The 2020 Italian Open (also known as the Rome Masters or the Internazionali BNL d'Italia for sponsorship reasons) is a professional tennis tournament played on outdoor clay courts at the Foro Italico in Rome, Italy.

Originally scheduled for 11–17 May 2020, but due to the COVID-19 pandemic, it was initially rescheduled to 20–26 September 2020, a week before the 2020 French Open. When the ATP schedule was later revised in August 2020, following the cancellation of this year's Mutua Madrid Open due to the resurgence of virus cases in Spain, organizers had to move the tournament earlier than planned by a week, and it is rescheduled to 14–21 September 2020. That leaves the dates were later placed for this year's Hamburg European Open (men) and Internationaux de Strasbourg (women). It is the 77th edition of the Italian Open and is classified as an ATP Tour Masters 1000 event on the 2020 ATP Tour and a Premier 5 event on the 2020 WTA Tour.

Points and prize money

Point distribution

Prize money

ATP singles main-draw entrants

Seeds

1 Rankings are as of August 31, 2020.

Other entrants
The following players received wild cards into the main singles draw:
  Jannik Sinner
  Gianluca Mager
  Salvatore Caruso
  Stefano Travaglia

The following player used a protected ranking into the main singles draw:
  Kevin Anderson

The following players received entry from the singles qualifying draw:
  Facundo Bagnis
  Marco Cecchinato
  Federico Coria
  Alejandro Davidovich Fokina
  Dominik Koepfer
  Pedro Martínez
  Lorenzo Musetti
  Tennys Sandgren

The following player received entry as a lucky loser:
  João Sousa

Withdrawals 
Before the tournament
  Roberto Bautista Agut → replaced by  Yoshihito Nishioka
  John Isner → replaced by  Marin Čilić
  Daniil Medvedev → replaced by  Lorenzo Sonego
  Dominic Thiem → replaced by  João Sousa
  Alexander Zverev → replaced by  Alexander Bublik

ATP doubles main-draw entrants

Seeds

Rankings are as of August 31, 2020.

Other entrants
The following pairs received wildcards into the doubles main draw:
  Simone Bolelli /  Fabio Fognini
  Gianluca Mager /  Andreas Seppi
  Lorenzo Sonego /  Andrea Vavassori

The following pair received entry using a protected ranking:
  Kevin Anderson /  Jonathan Erlich

WTA singles main-draw entrants

Seeds

1 Rankings are as of August 31, 2020.

Other entrants
The following players received wild cards into the main singles draw:
  Elisabetta Cocciaretto
  Camila Giorgi
  Jasmine Paolini
  Venus Williams
  Vera Zvonareva

The following player received entry as a special exempt:
  Victoria Azarenka

The following players received entry from the singles qualifying draw:
  Irina-Camelia Begu
  Anna Blinkova
  Aliona Bolsova
  Misaki Doi
  Kaja Juvan
  Daria Kasatkina
  Danka Kovinić
  Arantxa Rus

Withdrawals 
Before the tournament
  Bianca Andreescu → replaced by  Jil Teichmann
  Ashleigh Barty → replaced by  Anastasija Sevastova
  Jennifer Brady → replaced by  Hsieh Su-wei
  Madison Keys → replaced by  Caroline Garcia
  Petra Kvitová → replaced by  Marie Bouzková
  Kristina Mladenovic → replaced by  Ajla Tomljanović
  Karolína Muchová → replaced by  Iga Świątek
  Naomi Osaka → replaced by  Kateřina Siniaková
  Aryna Sabalenka → replaced by  Rebecca Peterson
  Maria Sakkari → replaced by  Coco Gauff
  Serena Williams → replaced by  Bernarda Pera
  Zheng Saisai → replaced by  Polona Hercog

WTA doubles main-draw entrants

Seeds

Rankings are as of August 31, 2020.

Other entrants
The following pairs received wildcards into the doubles main draw:
  Elisabetta Cocciaretto /  Martina Trevisan 
  Giulia Gatto-Monticone /  Jasmine Paolini

The following pair received entry using a protected ranking:
  Sharon Fichman /  Vera Zvonareva

The following pair received entry as alternates:
  Coco Gauff /  Christina McHale
  Magda Linette /  Bernarda Pera

Withdrawals
Before the tournament
  Elise Mertens
  Donna Vekić

Champions

Men's singles

  Novak Djokovic def.  Diego Schwartzman 7–5, 6–3.

This was Djokovic's 81st ATP Tour singles title, and fourth of the year.

Women's singles

  Simona Halep def.  Karolína Plíšková, 6–0, 2–1, ret.

This was Halep's 22nd WTA Tour singles title, and third of the year. With this victory, Halep extended her winning streak to 14 matches.

Men's doubles

  Marcel Granollers /  Horacio Zeballos def.  Jérémy Chardy /  Fabrice Martin, 6–4, 5–7, [10–8].

This was Granollers' 21st ATP Tour doubles title, and third of the year, and was Zeballos' 16th ATP Tour doubles title, and third of the year. This was also their fourth doubles title together as a pair.

Women's doubles

  Hsieh Su-wei /  Barbora Strýcová def.  Anna-Lena Friedsam /  Raluca Olaru, 6–2, 6–2

This was Hsieh's 28th WTA Tour doubles title, and fourth of the year, and was Strýcová's 31st WTA Tour doubles title, and fourth of the year. This was also their 9th doubles title together as a pair.

References

External links